Two Japanese Naval vessels have been named :

 , a transport ship active during the Boshin War

Imperial Japanese Navy ship names
Japanese Navy ship names